Kendall Thomas Brown (born May 11, 2003) is an American professional basketball player for the Indiana Pacers of the National Basketball Association (NBA), on a two-way contract with the Fort Wayne Mad Ants of the NBA G League. He played college basketball for the Baylor Bears. He was a consensus five-star recruit and one of the best small forwards in the 2021 class.

High school career
As a sophomore at East Ridge High School in Woodbury, Minnesota, Brown averaged 17.6 points and led the team to its first state tournament appearance. After the season, he transferred to Sunrise Christian Academy in Bel Aire, Kansas. Brown was teammates with top recruit Kennedy Chandler. As a senior, he helped his team reach the GEICO Nationals title game. He was named to the McDonald's All-American Game, Jordan Brand Classic and Nike Hoop Summit rosters.

Recruiting
Brown was a consensus five-star recruit and one of the best small forwards in the 2021 class. On July 20, 2020, he committed to playing college basketball for Baylor over offers from Kansas and Arizona, among others. Brown is the highest-ranked recruit to come to Baylor since Isaiah Austin in 2012. He said that since he came from a Christian high school, he liked the fact that Baylor was a Christian university.

College career
Prior to his freshman season, Brown was voted Preseason Big 12 Conference Freshman of the Year. In his college debut, Brown scored 13 points in a 87–60 victory over Incarnate Word. He earned Big 12 Newcomer of the Week honors twice (12/20, 3/7). As a freshman, Brown averaged 9.7 points and 4.9 rebounds per game. At the end of the season, he was named to the Big 12 All-Freshman Team. On March 30, 2022, Brown declared for the 2022 NBA draft, forgoing his remaining college eligibility.

Professional career

Indiana Pacers (2022–present)
Brown was selected with the 48th overall pick in the 2022 NBA draft by his hometown team, the Minnesota Timberwolves. On June 23, 2022, the Timberwolves traded his draft rights to the Indiana Pacers in exchange for cash considerations and a 2026 second-round pick. On September 16, Brown signed a two-way contract with the Pacers. On February 27, 2023, he underwent surgery to address a tibia stress fracture in his right leg and was ruled out indefinitely by the Pacers.

Career statistics

NBA

|-
| style="text-align:left;"| 
| style="text-align:left;"| Indiana
| 6 || 0 || 6.7 || .571 || .000 || .500 || 1.0 || .5 || .7 || .0 || 1.5
|- class="sortbottom"
| style="text-align:center;" colspan="2"| Career
| 6 || 0 || 6.7 || .571 || .000 || .500 || 1.0 || .5 || .7 || .0 || 1.5

College

|-
| style="text-align:left;"| 2021–22
| style="text-align:left;"| Baylor
| 34 || 34 || 27.0 || .584 || .341 || .689 || 4.9 || 1.9 || 1.0 || .4 || 9.7

Personal life
Brown's father, Courtney Sr., played professional basketball in South America, Switzerland and England, and was a member of the Harlem Globetrotters, before becoming a public school intervention specialist. His older brother, Courtney Jr., plays college basketball for St. Thomas (MN).

References

External links

Baylor Bears bio
USA Basketball bio

2003 births
Living people
American men's basketball players
Basketball players from Minnesota
Baylor Bears men's basketball players
Indiana Pacers players
McDonald's High School All-Americans
Minnesota Timberwolves draft picks
People from Cottage Grove, Minnesota
Shooting guards
Small forwards